Ebony is a hamlet south of Ashford in Kent, South East England, in the civil parish of Stone-cum-Ebony, on the Isle of Oxney in the Ashford district of Kent. EBONY (St. Mary), is a parish, in the union of Tenterden, partly in the hundred of Tenterden, Lower division of the lathe of Scray, W. division, but chiefly in the hundred of Oxney, lathe of Shepway, E. division, of Kent, 4 miles (S. E.) from Tenterden. [1]

The place-name 'Ebony' is first attested in a Saxon charter of 833, where it appears as Ebbanea. The name means 'Ebba's or Ybba's stream'.

Notable residents (past & present)
Norman Forbes-Robertson – distinguished Victorian Shakespearean actor
Dave McKean – illustrator, photographer, comic book artist, graphic designer, filmmaker and musician
Sir Donald Sinden CBE – distinguished actor
Marc Sinden – film director, actor and West End theatre producer
Maria Ann Smith – orchardist and cultivator of the Granny Smith apple was married here.

Ebony was formerly an island surrounded by marsh and the tidal waters of the River Rother. At the top of the most prominent part of the high ground, known as Chapel Bank, is the churchyard of the original Ebony Church, St Mary the Virgin. After lightning and fire damage the remains of the church, built of local ragstone, were moved by the Victorians in 1858 to the present location at nearby Reading Street, and restored. It has been suggested that references to King Osred II of Northumbria's exile at 'Ebonia' (Evania) in the Annals of Roger of Hoveden may refer to the strategically-situated Ebony in the marshlands of the South Coast, rather than to the Isle of Man or  the Hebrides. The fact that the church at Ebony was of Saxon foundation has been cited in support for this hypothesis; however there is no evidence for a 9th-century date for the church and the earliest reference is from 1070.

An annual pilgrimage from the Reading Street site of the church to the original site on Chapel Bank occurs in September.

The nearby church of the village of Stone-cum-Ebony, on the Isle of Oxney, is also dedicated to St Mary the Virgin, and should not be confused with Ebony church

References

External links
 Ebony Kent Local Tourism and Information web site

Villages in the Borough of Ashford
Hamlets in Kent